Shriyut Gangadhar Tipre was an Indian television series that aired on Alpha TV Marathi. The series started from 2 November 2001 and ended on 7 January 2005 after 165 episodes. The series was reran in the COVID-19 pandemic on viewers demand from 15 June to 11 July 2020.

Cast

Main 
 Dilip Prabhavalkar in the role of Shriyut Gangadhar Tipre (Aaba)
 Shubhangi Gokhale in the role of Shyamal Shekhar Tipre; Aaba's Daughter-in-law, Shekhar's wife, Shirya and Shalaka's mother
 Rajan Bhise in the role of Shekhar Gangadhar Tipre; Aaba's son, Shyamal's husband, Shirya and Shalaka's father
 Vikas Kadam in the role of Shrilesh Shekhar Tipre (Shirya); Aaba's grandson, Shyamal and Shekhar's son, Shalaka's brother
 Reshma Naik in the role of Shalaka Shekhar Tipre; Aaba's granddaughter, Shyamal and Shekhar's daughter, Shirya's sister

Recurring 
 Smita Talwalkar in the role of Meenakshi; Shyamal's childhood friend
 Mukta Barve in the role of Yogita
 Supriya Pathare in the role of Tipre's neighbour 
 Sunil Barve in the role of Siddharth
 Sumukhi Pendse in the role of Shaila
 Ravindra Berde in the role of Shirya's interviewer
 Kshitee Jog in the role of Nikita

Awards

References

External links 
 
 Shriyut Gangadhar Tipre at ZEE5

2001 Indian television series debuts
2005 Indian television series endings
Marathi-language television shows
Zee Marathi original programming